James Maurice Cronin (August 24, 1906 – April 6, 1942) was an American soccer player who was a member of the United States soccer team at the 1928 Summer Olympics and played in the St. Louis Soccer League.

He was a member of the U.S. soccer team at the 1928 Summer Olympics.    He played for Tablers in the St. Louis Soccer League.  In 1931, he moved to Andersons. Cronin died in 1942 in Harter, Illinois, aged 35.

He was inducted into the St. Louis Soccer Hall of Fame in 1978.

References

1906 births
1942 deaths
American soccer players
Olympic soccer players of the United States
Footballers at the 1928 Summer Olympics
St. Louis Soccer League players
St. Louis Tablers players
Soccer players from St. Louis
Association football midfielders